Charles Frederick Power (26 August 1878 – 26 March 1953) was an Irish field hockey player who competed in the 1908 Summer Olympics. In 1908 he represented the United Kingdom of Great Britain and Ireland as a member of the Irish national team, which won the silver medal.

References

External links
 

1878 births
1953 deaths
Members of the Ireland hockey team at the 1908 Summer Olympics
Irish male field hockey players
Medalists at the 1908 Summer Olympics
Olympic silver medallists for Great Britain
Three Rock Rovers Hockey Club players
Ireland international men's field hockey players